The Borman Bridge bringing a Cherry County, Nebraska road over the Niobrara River near Valentine, Nebraska was built in 1916, as a replacement for one of 18 Cherry County bridges washed away by flood and winter ice on February 16, 1916.  It was designed by the Canton Bridge Co. of Canton, Ohio, fabricated by the Cambria Steel Co. of Johnstown, and built by the Canton Bridge Co.

It has also been known as the Niobrara River Bridge and known as NEHBS No. CE00-224. It is a pinned Pratt through truss bridge that could be and was built quickly, and has since carried only light traffic.  It cost $4,230.

It was listed on the National Register of Historic Places in 1992.

References

External links 
More photos of the Borman Bridge at Wikimedia Commons

Road bridges on the National Register of Historic Places in Nebraska
Bridges completed in 1916
Bridges in Cherry County, Nebraska
National Register of Historic Places in Cherry County, Nebraska
Steel bridges in the United States
1916 establishments in Nebraska